The 8th National Congress of the Kuomintang was the eight national congress of the Kuomintang, held on 10–23 October 1957 at Taipei, Taiwan.

Results
During the congress, Chen Cheng was elected as Chiang Kai-shek's deputy, as the Deputy Director-General of the Kuomintang.

See also
 Kuomintang

References

1957 conferences
1957 in Taiwan
National Congresses of the Kuomintang
Politics of Taiwan